Gisburg (born in 1966 as Gisburg Smialek) is an Austrian Composer, Singer and Music Editor for Film.

Biography

Gisburg born in Salzburg/ Austria. She began studying modern music theater with Dieter Schnebel and was touring around the world as a concert singer with his vocal group Die Maulwerker. She attended the Berlin University as a guest student for composition and modern music theatre with Prof. Dieter Schnebel and Prof. Witold Szalonek and for visual arts with Eva Maria Schön. She moved to New York City in 1992 and performed around the Knitting factory and Roulette scene. She recorded albums for Tzadik. and GP music. She was a member of the Chinese Hai-Tien choir with Mrs. Pi-Chu Hsiao for 6 years, and recorded with Gary Lucas Chinese pop music of the 1930s and 1950s.

She scored several music scores for films  and works as a music editor in NYC.

Besides this she is the co-founder of the Filmette Film Festival , with Drew Pisarra and Loui Terrier. Filmette is a Film Festival which champions films outside the usual Festival time constraints.

References

1966 births
Living people
Musicians from Salzburg
20th-century Austrian women singers
Austrian women composers
Tzadik Records artists